Stranraer and the Rhins (Ward 1) is one of the twelve wards used to elect members of Dumfries and Galloway Council in Scotland. It elects four Councillors under the Single Transferable Vote system.

Profile 
The ward is situated on the far west side of the region within Galloway and Wigtownshire. The dominant settlement is Stranraer, Dumfries and Galloway’s second largest town. Other settlements include the ferry port of Cairnryan and villages in the Rhins of Galloway peninsula including Ardwell, Drummore, Kirkcolm, Leswalt, Port Logan, Portpatrick, Sandhead, and Stoneykirk. The ward includes Dumfries and Galloway’s largest secondary school, Stranraer Academy, as well as Scotland’s most southernly point. Stranraer and the Rhins has an electorate of 11,615.

Councillors

Election results

2022 Election

2022 Dumfries and Galloway Council Election

2017 Election
2017 Dumfries and Galloway Council election

2012 Election
2012 Dumfries and Galloway Council election

2007 Election
2007 Dumfries and Galloway Council election

References

Wards of Dumfries and Galloway
Rhins of Galloway